North Cheriton is a small village and civil parish in South Somerset with a population of 208. It is located on the A357 south-west of Wincanton.

History
North Cheriton is mentioned as a manor belonging to William de Moyon in the Domesday Book in 1086.

The parish was part of the hundred of Horethorne.

Church
The Grade II* Listed Parish Church is dedicated to St John the Baptist, and is one of the "Camelot Parishes" in the Diocese of Bath and Wells. Interred in the Churchyard are the ashes of Betty Clay (16 April 1917 – 24 April 2004) and her husband Gervas (16 April 1907 – 18 April 2009).

Governance

The parish council has responsibility for local issues, including setting an annual precept (local rate) to cover the council's operating costs and producing annual accounts for public scrutiny. The parish council evaluates local planning applications and works with the local police, district council officers, and neighbourhood watch groups on matters of crime, security, and traffic. The parish council's role also includes initiating projects for the maintenance and repair of parish facilities, as well as consulting with the district council on the maintenance, repair, and improvement of highways, drainage, footpaths, public transport, and street cleaning. Conservation matters (including trees and listed buildings) and environmental issues are also the responsibility of the council.

The village falls within the Non-metropolitan district of South Somerset, which was formed on 1 April 1974 under the Local Government Act 1972, having previously been part of Wincanton Rural District. The district council is responsible for local planning and building control, local roads, council housing, environmental health, markets and fairs, refuse collection and recycling, cemeteries and crematoria, leisure services, parks, and tourism.

Somerset County Council is responsible for running the largest and most expensive local services such as education, social services, libraries, main roads, public transport, policing and fire services, trading standards, waste disposal and strategic planning.

It is also part of the Somerton and Frome county constituency represented in the House of Commons of the Parliament of the United Kingdom. It elects one Member of Parliament (MP) by the first past the post system of election.

References

External links

Villages in South Somerset
Civil parishes in Somerset